"Sentimental" is a song by American Smooth jazz saxophonist Kenny G, from his sixth studio album, Breathless (1992).

Chart performance
"Sentimental" was the third song of the album Breathless to reach the Billboard Hot 100 chart in 1993. The song reached number 72. A year later it also appeared on the Adult Contemporary, reaching number 27.

Track listings

Personnel
 Kenny G – soprano saxophone, drum programming 
 Walter Afanasieff – keyboards, synth bass, arrangements 
 Dean Parks – guitars 
 Paulinho da Costa – percussion

Charts

References

External links
 Kenny G's official Website

1990s instrumentals
1992 songs
1993 singles
Arista Records singles
Kenny G songs
Songs written by Walter Afanasieff